Barricade (1975) is Bengali drama written and directed by Utpal Dutt. The drama is set into a revolution time or war time when people's army are fighting against the state army.

Plot 
Between  1933–1937 Germany saw the rise of Adolf Hitler. This drama is set into that time when Hitler is rising to power.  The whole drama is a conversation between different intellectuals and bourgeoisies of the society like an engineer, an author, an artist and a journalist. While the battle is going on in the town, these people just can not stay neutral and have to join any one side

See also
 Adolf Hitler in popular culture

References 

1975 plays
Bengali-language plays
Indian plays
Works about Adolf Hitler